This is a list of fishing villages. A fishing village is a village, usually located near a fishing ground, with an economy based on catching fish and harvesting seafood.

Fishing villages

Akwidaa, Ghana
Amed, Indonesia
Bethsaida, Israel (historical)
Capernaum, Israel (historical)
Chibu, Japan
Chorkor, Ghana
Huanchaco, Peru
Kakapir, Pakistan
Marsaxlokk, Malta
Myliddy, Sri Lanka
Ninh Thủy, Vietnam
Reposaari, Finland
Salehabad, Pakistan
Sayulita, Nayarit, Mexico
Smygehuk, Sweden
Sucuriju, Brazil
Taganga, Colombia
Taghazout, Moroccoo
Udappu, Sri Lanka
Volendam, Netherlands
Walraversijde, Belgium

Canada
Ladner, British Columbia
Old Perlican, Newfoundland and Labrador
Overton, Nova Scotia
Peggys Cove, Nova Scotia
Red Bay, Newfoundland and Labrador
St. Laurent, Manitoba
Steveston, British Columbia
Tilting, Newfoundland and Labrador

China
Po Toi O, Hong Kong
Tai O, Hong Kong
Yanglingang, Jiangsu

Denmark
Snogebæk
Sørvágur, Faroe Islands
Thyborøn
Vorupør

Estonia
Altja
Käsmu
Prangli

France
Barfleur, Manche
Ciboure, Nouvelle-Aquitaine
Douarnenez, Finistère
Granville, Manche, Manche
Le Guilvinec, Finistère
Ile-de-Sein, Finistère
Paimpol, Côtes-d'Armor
Saint-Jean-de-Luz, Nouvelle-Aquitaine

Greece
Agios Nikolaos
Alykes
Charaki
Kassiopi
Sigri

Iceland
Bolungarvík
Hjalteyri
Stokkseyri
Súðavík
Suðureyri

India
Puthenthope, Kerala
Covelong, Tamil Nadu
Eraviputhenthurai, Tamil Nadu

Ireland
An Rinn
Dunmore East
Easky

Italy
Portofino, Liguria
Vernazza, Liguria

Malta
Marsaskala
Marsalforn
Marsaxlokk
Bugibba

Norway
Grip
Hovden
Kamøyvær
Moskenes
Nyksund
Ona
Reine

Portugal
Alvor
Aveiro
Cascais
Câmara de Lobos
Carvoeiro
Nazaré
Olhos de Água
Peniche
Salema

South Africa
 Amsterdamhoek
 Hondeklip Bay

Spain
Bermeo, Basque Country
Elantxobe, Basque Country
Getaria, Basque Country
Hondarribia, Basque Country
Lekeitio, Basque Country
Los Nietos, Region of Murcia
Mutriku, Basque Country
Ondarroa, Basque Country
Orio, Basque Country
Sa Riera, Catalonia
Santa Pola, Valencian Community
Zumaia, Basque Country

Suriname
 Boskamp
 Braamspunt

Turkey
Gümüşlük
Peksimet

United Kingdom
Catalan Bay, Gibraltar

England
Cadgwith
Cullercoats
Lamorna
Mousehole
Port Isaac
Robin Hood's Bay
Rock

Northern Ireland
Ardglass
Portavogie

Scotland
East Haven
Harrow
Lochinver
Newhaven
Pittenweem
Portmahomack
St Abbs

Wales
Ferryside

United States
Delacroix Island, Louisiana
Reggio, Louisiana
Kaunolu, Hawaii (historical)
Pu'upehe, Hawaii
Saint Malo, Louisiana (historical)
Shell Beach, Louisiana
Villa Pesquera, Puerto Rico
Wanchese, North Carolina
Cedar Key, Florida

See also

 Community-supported fishery
 Fishing
 Fishing industry
 Uru people – a pre-Incan people who live on forty-two self-fashioned floating islands in Lake Titicaca Puno, Peru and Bolivia

References

 
 Fishing